Pavel Dmitriyevich Lelyukhin (born 23 April 1998) is a Russian football player.

Club career
He made his debut in the Russian Professional Football League for FC Dynamo-2 Moscow on 20 July 2016 in a game against FC Tekstilshchik Ivanovo. Lelyukhin played in the Russian Football National League with FC Spartak-2 Moscow.

On 4 September 2018 he signed with the Cypriot club Pafos.

International
He was on the roster for the Russia national under-17 football team at the 2015 FIFA U-17 World Cup, but did not play in any games at the tournament.

Career statistics

References

External links
 Profile by Russian Professional Football League

1998 births
Footballers from Moscow
Living people
Russian footballers
Russia youth international footballers
Association football defenders
Association football midfielders
FC Dynamo Moscow reserves players
FC Spartak-2 Moscow players
Pafos FC players
Russian First League players
Russian Second League players
Cypriot First Division players
Russian expatriate footballers
Expatriate footballers in Cyprus
Russian expatriate sportspeople in Cyprus